This is the list of attacks and conflicts that occurred in 2019 in the course of the Insurgency in the North Caucasus, a low-intensity conflict in Russia's North Caucasian republics.

See also 
 List of clashes in the North Caucasus in 2009
 List of clashes in the North Caucasus in 2010
 List of clashes in the North Caucasus in 2011
 List of clashes in the North Caucasus in 2012
 List of clashes in the North Caucasus in 2015
 List of clashes in the North Caucasus in 2016
 List of clashes in the North Caucasus in 2017
 List of clashes in the North Caucasus in 2018

References 

Clashes in the North Caucasus
Clashes in the North Caucasus
North Caucasus
Lists of clashes in the North Caucasus
Lists of armed conflicts in 2019